The New South Wales Metropolitan Rail Area (MRA) is the government-operated railway network centred on Sydney and bounded by Newcastle Interchange in the north,  in the west, and Glenlee and  in the south. The MRA contains the entirety of the state's electrified rail network (save for the isolated Skitube Alpine Railway). The MRA is owned by Transport Asset Holding Entity and maintained by Sydney Trains.

Background 
Prior to 2004, the entire NSW Government-owned rail network was operated by the then Rail Infrastructure Corporation (RIC). In preparation for the planned lease of the interstate and Hunter Valley networks to the Australian Rail Track Corporation (ARTC), the Transport Administration Act 1988 was amended in 2003 to define a "metropolitan rail area", to be managed by a new agency called RailCorp. The residual non-metropolitan, non-ARTC network remained with RIC as the Country Regional Network, and is now managed directly by Transport for NSW.

Boundaries 
Between December 2014 and October 2017, however, trains have only operated as far as Hamilton. Train services were extended back to the new Newcastle Interchange when it opened in October 2017. The Main North railway continues north from  into the ARTC-operated Hunter Valley network.

At its western extent, the MRA is bounded by the former station at Bowenfels, a few kilometres west of the town of Lithgow. The western section of the network extends 158 kilometres from Central and is electrified for its entire length. The Main West railway continues west from Bowenfels into the Transport for New South Wales operated Country Regional Network.

At its south-western extent, the MRA is bounded by the rural locality of Glenlee. The south-western section of the network extends 58 kilometres from Central and is electrified for its entire length. The Main South railway continues south from Glenlee into the ARTC-operated interstate network.

At its south-eastern extent, the MRA is bounded by Bomaderry Station. Bomaderry is also the terminus of the South Coast railway.

The Southern Sydney Freight Line and Sydney Freight Network are physically within, but do not form part of, the MRA. These are reserved for use by freight trains and are operated and maintained by ARTC.

Operations 
All Sydney Trains services operate within the MRA. NSW TrainLink intercity and regional services operate beyond the MRA.

See also 
 Sydney Trains
 NSW TrainLink
 Australian Rail Track Corporation

External links 
 RailCorp

References 

2004 establishments in Australia
Rail transport in Sydney
Rail infrastructure in New South Wales